Monang Carvajal (born Patrocinio Tagaroma Carvajal; 1898 – 22 June 1980) was a Filipina film actress best known for her roles in thriller and horror movies. She was dubbed the "Queen of Horror Pictures."

Biography
Carvajal was born in Manila in 1898, the daughter of Spanish Zarzuela actors Don Jose Carvajal and Patrocinio Tagaroma de Carvajal. By the age of 4, she was appearing on stage, appearing alongside her parents. In her teens, she was touring the bodabil circuit together with Manuel Silos as a comedy duo known as "Monang & Sano." Silos would later become a prominent film director.

Carvajal made her film debut in 1920, in the silent film El Trust de los Tenorios. Soon, she found herself frequently cast in horror films, often as a monster, a witch (mangkukulam) or some other supernatural being. Along her roles in this vein were in such films as Sumpa ng Aswang (1935), Gamu-Gamong Naging Lawin (1937), Halimaw (1941), and Malaya, Mutya ng Gubat (1948).

Carvajal was also adept as a film comedian as well, appearing in comic roles in Ay Monang (1939), Victory Joe (1946), and Principe Amante (1950). In 1962, she would be nominated for a FAMAS Best Supporting Actress award for her role in El Filibusterismo, Gerardo de Leon's film version of Jose Rizal's second novel. Thirty-two years earlier, Carvajal had appeared in a silent film version of Rizal's first novel, Noli Me Tangere.

Carvajal maintained an active film career until nearly the end of her life, appearing in Mga Bilangong Birhen (1977). She died from cancer at Cardinal Santos Medical Center in June 1980.

Family
Her brothers, Jose Carvajal and Alfonso Carvajal, as well as her daughter Perla, her granddaughter, Baby Delfino, and great-granddaughter, Alma Concepcion, all had careers as actors in the Philippines' film industry.

Monang Carvajal's son Ernesto and grandson Maurice were film make-up artists who specialized in prosthetics.

Monang Carvajal's nephew, Carlos K Carvajal, is an internationally known choreographer and director. He is the present co-artistic director of the San Francisco Ethnic Dance Festival 2015.

Monang Carvajal's grand niece, Celina Carvajal [aka Lena Hall] won the 2014 Tony Award for best actress in a Broadway musical for her role as Istzak in "Hedwig and the Angry Inch."

Filmography

silent movie
1930: Noli me Tangere
1932: Sa Labi ng Lumang Libingan
1933: Ang Aswang

sound movie

1933: Doctor Kuba
1934: X3X
1935: Sumpa ng Aswang
1935: Himala ni Bathala
1937: Gamu-gamong Naging Lawin
1939: Ay! monang
1940: Hali
1941: Panibugho
1941: Binibini ng Palengke
1941: Halimaw
1941: Serenata sa Nayon
1941: Palaris
1941: Mariposa
1941: Manilena
1946: Principeng hindi tumatawa
1946: Ligaya
1946: Victory Joe
1947: Nabasag ang banga
1947: Ikaw ang mahal ko
1947: Si Juan Tamad
1947: Oh, Salapi!
1947: Maling Akala
1948: Malaya (aka Mutya sa Gubat)
1949: Gitano
1950: Doctor X
1954: Dalaginding
1954: Mabangong Kandungan
1954: Dambanang Putik
1955: Lapu-Lapu
1955: Indian Pana
1955: Talusaling - Inang
1955: Tagapagmana
1956: Anak Dalia
1960: Katotohanan o guniguni? - Fourth Story
1960: Si Marita at ang Pitong Duwende
1961: Prinsipe Diomedes at ang mahiwagang gitara
1961: The Moises Padilla Story
1962: El filibusterismo
1962: Puro labis puro kulang
1962: Kababalaghan o kabulastugan? - Sepulturero (Second Story)
1965: Tagisan ng mga agimat
1977: Mga Bilanggong Birhen
1979: Angelita... Ako ang iyong ina - the Witch (final film role)

References

Sources

External links

1898 births
1980 deaths
Deaths from cancer in the Philippines
Filipino silent film actresses
Actresses from Manila
Date of birth missing
Filipino film actresses
20th-century Filipino actresses